William Watkin may refer to:

William Watkin (MP for Pembroke) (fl.1558), MP for Pembroke Boroughs, Wales
William Watkin (MP for Wells) (fl.1592-1597), mayor and MP for Wells, Somerset, England
William Thompson Watkin (1836–1888), English archaeologist

See also
William Watkins (disambiguation)